Squint was the 1993 critically acclaimed return of Steve Taylor as a solo artist after his stint as the lead singer of Chagall Guevara. Highlights of the album include "The Lament of Desmond RG Underwood Frederick IV," "Easy Listening," "Jesus is for Losers," "The Finish Line," "Bannerman," and "Curses." It was the last studio album released by Steve Taylor as a solo artist. It peaked at position 17 on the Billboard Top Contemporary Christian Album Chart. The album was released to online music stores on November 16, 2018.

Track listing
All Songs Written by Steve Taylor.

 "The Lament of Desmond R.G. Underwood-Frederick IV" - 4:02
 "Bannerman" - 3:14
 "Smug" - 4:22
 "Jesus Is for Losers" - 4:19
 "The Finish Line" - 5:25
 "The Moshing Floor" - 4:01
 "Easy Listening" - 3:42
 "Curses" - 3:55
 "Sock Heaven" - 4:46
 "Cash Cow (A Rock Opera In Three Small Acts)" - 5:38

Personnel
Some Band
 Steve Taylor - vocals
 Wade Jaynes - bass(es), guitar on Act III of "Cash Cow"
 Jerry McPherson - guitars
 Mike Mead - drums
 Phil Madeira - keyboards, slide guitar and sampled percussion on "Sock Heaven" and backwards slide on "Cash Cow," The Last Voice You Hear on "Smug"

Additional musicians
 George Bradfute - guitars on "The Lament...", left speaker guitar and solo on "The Moshing Floor", additional guitars on Act III of "Cash Cow"
 Dave Perkins - rhythm guitar on "Bannerman" (including that catchy riff)
 Carl Marsh - strings on "The Finish Line" and "The Moshing Floor"
 Eric Darken -percussion instruments, tambourine on "Easy Listening" and "The Finish Line"
 Russ Long - remaining tambourines, electronic drums on "Easy Listening"
 Donna McElroy - vocals on "Sock Heaven"

Production notes
Produced and written by Steve Taylor.
Engineered by Russ Long.
Mixed by David Bryson, assisted by Matt Murman.
Made at The Salt Mine, Nashville.
Mixed at Different Fur, San Francisco.
Mastered by Bob Ludwig at Gateway Mastering, Portland.

Charting

References

Squint
Steve Taylor albums